The R745 road is a regional road in County Wexford, Ireland. It connects the R702 road at Wheelagower with the R772 road (formerly N11) at Ferns. Following the opening of the M11 motorway from Gorey to Enniscorthy, parts of the N11 near the motorway were renumbered to R772.

The R745 passes through the villages of Ballindaggin and Ballycarney.

References

Regional roads in the Republic of Ireland
Roads in County Wexford